The lavender waxbill (Glaucestrilda caerulescens) is a common species of estrildid finch native to Central Africa and successfully introduced on Hawai'i. It has an estimated global extent of occurrence of 620,000 km2.

Habitat
It is found in subtropical/tropical (lowland) dry shrubland habitats in Benin, Burkina Faso, Cameroon, Central African Republic, Chad, Côte d'Ivoire, Gambia, Ghana, Guinea, Guinea-Bissau, Liberia, Mali, Niger, Nigeria, Senegal, Sudan, Togo and the United States (Hawaii island only). The IUCN has classified the species as being of least concern.

Origin
Origin and phylogeny has been obtained by Antonio Arnaiz-Villena et al. Estrildinae may have originated in India and dispersed thereafter (towards Africa and Pacific Ocean habitats).

References

External links
BirdLife International species factsheet

lavender waxbill
Birds of West Africa
lavender waxbill
Taxa named by Louis Jean Pierre Vieillot
Taxobox binomials not recognized by IUCN